Misinformation related to 5G technology is widespread in many countries of the world. The spreading of false information and conspiracy theories have also been propagated by the general public and celebrities. In social media, misinformation related to 5G has been presented as facts, and shared extensively. There are no scientifically proven adverse health impacts from the exposure to 5G radio frequency radiation with levels below those suggested by the guidelines of regulating bodies, including the International Commission on Non-Ionizing Radiation Protection (ICNIRP). Furthermore, studies have shown that there is no noticeable increase in the everyday radiofrequency electromagnetic exposure since 2012, despite the increased use of communication devices.

Extent
In a survey conducted in the US, 1500 adults were asked whether the US government is using the COVID-19 vaccine to place microchips in the population. 5% of the survey takers said that this was definitely true and 15% said that it was probably true. Many wrongly believe these microchips will be controlled via 5G. In a survey conducted among the residents of Nordic countries, 61% replied that they did not know enough about 5G, or how it affects their lives. In 2018, 67% of the Nordic consumers expressed that they would eventually switch to 5G when it became available. In 2020, this figure dropped to 61%, which could be due to misinformation related to 5G. It may also be due to the perceived lack of benefits of 5G over the existing 4G in terms of consumer applications.

One third of British people said in a 2020 survey that they cannot rule out a link between COVID-19 and 5G. Eight percent of the survey takers believed that there is a link between the two, while 19% remained unsure.

A 2020 study that monitored data from Google Trends showed that searches related to coronavirus and 5G started at different times, but peaked in the same week of April 5 in six countries.

Misinformation about the origin of the COVID-19 pandemic, such as its origin is from 5G technology, has been reported to cause higher anxiety in a study conducted in Jordan.

A 2020 study analysing Twitter data related to tweets about 5G and COVID-19 showed that 34% of the tweeters believed in the role of 5G in the COVID-19 outbreak, while 32% denounced or mocked it.

List of popular misinformation

Origin
There have been conspiracy theories suggesting that the spread of the COVID-19 virus from the epicentre of the pandemic in Wuhan, China, is linked to the large number of 5G towers in the city. However, the truth is that 5G technology is not fully deployed in Wuhan.

Health impact

 5G causes cancer: It is very unlikely that exposure to the 5G radiofrequency will cause cancer. 5G is non-ionizing radiation, and such radiation does not damage DNA. Cancer is generally caused by ionizing radiations that damage DNA.
 5G is the cause for COVID-19: Some people think that since COVID-19 pandemic started during the deployment of 5G technology, they must be connected somehow. This concern is unfounded, and there is undisputable evidence that COVID-19 is a viral disease that has no relationship with 5G or cellular technology.
 5G weakens the immune system: There is no evidence to suggest that the low levels of radiation emitted by 5G technology can have any effect on the immune system, including on antigens, antibodies or in the process of oxidative stress.

Environmental impact
 5G kills birds or insects: Radio wave emissions above 10 MHz from cell telephone towers are not known to harm birds. Mass bee deaths that happened in many parts of the world are not related to 5G deployment.

Government and industrial surveillance
 COVID-19 is a cover to embed microchips within COVID-19 vaccine for controlling people via 5G: A microchip with tracking capabilities or 5G functionality would need to be much larger than the bore of a needle, so it would not be possible to inject through a syringe. It would require a syringe that is about 13 times larger than the one used now to incorporate the size of such a chip. Additionally, the microchip would not function without a power source capable of transmitting a signal through at least an inch of muscle, fat, and skin.
 The 5G grid is part of a larger surveillance and artificial intelligence agenda: The fact is that 5G is nothing more than a technology which establishes wireless connections between devices and the internet, with a higher speed and capacity than older technologies such as 4G or 3G. It is only up to the application developers whether to use this wireless connection for any purpose, including surveillance. In that sense, any wireless technology (including 4G or 3G) can also be used for surveillance. 
 5G is a weapons system that governments and industries disguise as new technology: Some people likened the 5G radiofrequency transmitters to the US military's direct energy weapon called Active Denial System (ADS), which was used to heat the surface of targets, such as the skin of targeted human beings. Although both ADS and 5G use radio waves, 5G transmits over a much lower frequency which is safe for humans. Moreover, 5G transmits at a much lower power than ADS.
 5G frequencies are used for crowd dispersal
 5G maps the insides of bodies and homes
 5G replicates inside the body and causes re-radiation

Misconception of 5G principal concepts
 Installing new 5G base stations over a given area may result in an uncontrollable increase of radiofrequency "pollution": Dense deployment of 5G base stations is beneficial to the users living in proximity to them, because there is abrupt decrease of radiofrequency compared to sparse deployment. Installing additional base stations over the area may be needed for supporting an increasing number of users with higher data rates. As a result, the distance between users and the nearest base station shrinks. This is called network densification, which may be wrongly perceived to increase the health impacts of 5G. However, unlike the common perception, network densification can reduce the average electromagnetic field exposure. Lower network densification means that each base station should cover a larger area, leading to higher radiated power for each cell. Additionally, dense deployment of 5G base stations leads to reduced radiation from mobile phones since connecting base stations are closer to mobile phones. Typically, radiation from base stations is lower than the radiations from mobile phones, since the radiation power decreases with the square of distance from the source.

Impact
The unsupported health theories have already led to vandalism and burning of some 5G equipment, particularly in the United Kingdom. Unfounded health fears have stalled the network upgrades necessary to reach faster speeds in some cities, while the coronavirus pandemic has slowed sales of 5G-compatible phones.

List of protests
 In April 2020, arsonists in the U.K. set 5G wireless towers in Birmingham, Liverpool, and Merseyside on fire and then uploaded videos of the vandalism to social media.
 Australian anti-vaxxers protested against 5G technology, large pharmaceutical corporations and COVID-19 vaccines in Melbourne and Sydney. Almost 90 attacks against mobile masts were reported during COVID-19 lockdown in the UK. Nearly 50 assaults were recorded against telecom engineers in the UK.
 Seven cell phone towers were burned in Canada by 5G skeptics in May 2020.
In April 2020, anti-5G protestors in the Netherlands sabotaged and set fire to several 5G towers and sprayed an anti-5G slogan at the scene of an attack. The Dutch government said it reported “various incidents” around broadcasting masts and considered opposition to the 5G rollout as a possible cause, according to a statement on its website. It also warned that attacks targeting 5G network equipment "can have consequences for the coverage of the telecommunications network and reachability of emergency services."
Global protest of "Invisible" people on 16 June 2022. Yellow chairs were set up in public spaces around the world to portray electrohypersensitive people that could not be present. The International EHS Day was initiated by the French EHS organization Coeurs d’EHS back in 2018.

Efforts to counter misinformation
Many organisations, including the World Health Organization, have created mythbusters and educational material to counter misinformation related to 5G, especially about its effect on health. The Australian Parliament, in its inquiry into 5G technology, has noted that community confidence in 5G has been shaken by extensive misinformation, and government agencies as well as industries have stepped up to provide trustworthy information to the public.

In April 2020, Twitter updated its policy on 'unverified claims that incite harmful activity' which could, among other things, could lead to the damage of 5G infrastructure. In June 2020, Twitter started placing fact checking labels on tweets about 5G and COVID-19. Facebook has removed several posts with false claims of associations between 5G and COVID-19.

A 2020 study recommends that denunciation of the 5G and COVID-19 theory from a world leader would have helped in mitigating the spread of misinformation. The study also recommends that the fight against misinformation should ideally happen in the platform where the misinformation is being shared. Appeals from cultural figures with large following on social media can also help reduce misinformation. The general public can stop the spread of misinformation by reporting harmful content as well as by not sharing or engaging with them.

References

Misinformation
5G (telecommunication)